Northern Liberties is a neighborhood in Philadelphia, Pennsylvania. Prior to its incorporation into Philadelphia in 1854, it was among the top 10 largest cities in the U.S. in every census from 1790 to 1850.

Boundaries
Northern Liberties is located north of Center City (specifically, Old City) and is bordered by Girard Avenue to the north; Callowhill Street to the south; North 6th Street to the west; and the Delaware River to the east (from Callowhill Street to Laurel Street; from Laurel Street to Girard Avenue the eastern boundary is North Front Street).

The historical boundaries were slightly different, with Vine Street as the southern border and the Cohocksink Creek serving as the northern border.  The creek now flows as a storm sewer under the following streets (starting at the Delaware River and running from southeast to northwest): Canal, Laurel, Bodine, Cambridge, and Orkney Streets.

History

Originally a portion of the Northern Liberties Township, the district first gained limited autonomy from the township by an Act of Assembly on March 9, 1771. The Act provided for the appointment of persons to regulate streets, direction of buildings, etc. By March 30, 1791 a second Act enabled the inhabitants of that portion of the Northern Liberties between Vine Street and Pegg's Run (Cohoquinoque Creek) and the middle of Fourth Street and the Delaware River to elect three commissioners to lay taxes for the purpose of lighting, watching and establishing pumps within those bounds.

During the Yellow Fever epidemics of the late eighteenth and early nineteenth centuries, the Northern Liberties district was hard hit, with many fatalities.

On March 28, 1803, the Legislature passed an act to incorporate that part of the township of the Northern Liberties lying between the west side of Sixth Street and the Delaware River and between Vine Street and Cohocksink Creek, thus creating the District of Northern Liberties. Under the Act of Consolidation, 1854, the district ceased to exist, and became a part of Philadelphia.

Early in its history, the location just outside Philadelphia allowed the area to thrive in manufacturing, as mills, breweries, leather tanneries, paints and chemical works, tool making factories, and iron and stove foundries once lined the neighborhood. It also holds the status as a famous red-light district in the United States.  Prior to annexation, the township was created as a less densely populated alternative to nearby Philadelphia.  Because of this, it was later known colloquially as "Philadelphia's first suburb." However, the Southwark neighborhood claims this distinction as well.

Artisan immigrants from Germany settled in the Northern Liberties in great numbers in the 19th century.  In the first decades of the 20th century, the area saw an influx of immigrants from Eastern Europe. Numbers of Slovak and Romanians left the challenges they faced in the waning years of the Austro-Hungarian Empire. Slovaks established St. Agnes Slovak Roman Catholic Church at the intersection of Fourth and Brown Street. The Romanians who settled in the area established Holy Trinity Romanian Orthodox Church at the intersection of American and Brown Streets, where they and their descendants continue to worship.

From 1860 to 1987, the Christian Schmidt Brewing Company was located in Northern Liberties.

In 1985, the Northern Liberties Historic District was created, dedicated to preserving the Italianate architecture, Greek revival, and Federal style buildings which characterizes the area. The historic district is bounded by Brown, Boone and Galloway, Green and Wallace, and Fifth and Sixth Streets.  The district encompasses 209 contributing buildings. It was added to the National Register of Historic Places in 1985. Also located in Northern Liberties and listed on the National Register of Historic Places are the Daniel Boone School, Burk Brothers and Company, Integrity Title Insurance, Trust and Safe Deposit Company, Thomas Jefferson School, Mifflin School, and St. John's Church.

Today

In recent years, Northern Liberties has become a major enclave of young professionals, students, artists, and design professionals. Large improvement and revitalization projects have also been undertaken recently, causing a large jump in property values. The neighborhood's proximity to Center City has made it one of the city's most desirable development districts, both for commercial and residential real estate. Like most Philadelphia neighborhoods, the housing stock is primarily made up of rowhouses, although new development in recent times has brought apartment and condominium complexes.

Northern Liberties contains two privately owned but public parks, both established and owned by non-profits run by the neighbors. Orianna Hill Park is known as an off-leash area for dogs; the other, Liberty Lands, is a  park and playground.

Northern Liberties is served by SEPTA's Market–Frankford El with stops at Spring Garden and Girard. The station at Spring Garden is unique for being in the median of I-95. The elevated line's tracks then break away from the expressway's right-of-way to tower over Front Street through the neighborhood as it heads north away from Center City.

In 2005, service resumed on SEPTA's long-delayed Girard Avenue trolley at the northern boundary of the neighborhood.

The doughboy statue, erected in memory of ward residents who served in World War I, is a long-honored landmark of Northern Liberties.
Northern Liberties, an area of the city geographically categorized as north of Old City and bordered by Girard Avenue to the north; Callowhill Street to the south; North 6th Street to the west; and the Delaware River to the east - locals refer to it as NoLibs. CBS Philly quoted Forbes.com naming NoLibs as making #14 among their annual list of the 20 “Hippest Hipster Neighborhoods” in America.

Economy

The area is home to numerous boutique stores and small bars and restaurants.

A SuperFresh supermarket opened in August 2011 on 2nd Street between Girard and Germantown Avenues, near the Piazza, a large mixed-use development owned by Post Brothers Apartments. The supermarket is now an Acme.

Yards Brewing Company is located in Northern Liberties. The SEER Interactive headquarters are also located in the neighborhood.

Education

Primary and secondary schools
Northern Liberties residents are assigned to schools in the School District of Philadelphia.

Residents south of Poplar Street are zoned to the General Philip Kearny School for grades Kindergarten through 8.

Students zoned to Kearny are also zoned to Benjamin Franklin High School.

Residents north of Poplar Street are zoned to James R. Ludlow School for grades Kindergarten through 8 and Kensington High School for grades 9 through 12.

Other schools in Northern Liberties consist of:
 Laboratory Charter School (one campus)
 Walter D. Palmer Leadership Academy
 Bodine High School of International Affairs

Public libraries
Residents are served by the Ramonita de Rodriguez Branch of the Free Library of Philadelphia, which is located at 600 West Girard Avenue. The branch was known as the Girard Avenue Branch prior to the 1977 rename.

Religious life

Churches and houses of worship
 Ukrainian Catholic Cathedral of the Immaculate Conception
 Immaculate Conception Catholic Church, Front and Allen Streets 
 Seamens Church Institute, 475 N. 5th Street
 St. Andrew's Russian Orthodox Cathedral, 707 N 5th Street
 St. Peter's Catholic Church,/St. John Neumann Shrine 5th Street and Girard Avenue
 St. Michael's Russian Orthodox, 335 Fairmount Avenue
 Covenant House of God, 721 N 5th Street
 St. Agnes-St. John Slovak Catholic Church, 4th and Brown Streets
 Second Christian Missionary, 1150 N 4th Street
 Holy Trinity Romanian Orthodox Church, 723 N. Bodine Street

Notable residents

Jake Elliott (born 1995), American football kicker
Gabe Kapler (born 1975), Major League Baseball outfielder and manager
James Landy (1813–1875), politician
John T. McIntyre (1871–1951), novelist
William Millward (1822–1871), politician
Albert F. Sabo (1920–2002), lawyer and judge
Charles Yerkes (1837–1905), financier

See also

Edgar Allan Poe National Historic Site

References

External links

NorthernLiberties.org NorthernLiberties.org - Created in 2001 - Home of the Northern Liberties Message Board, a bulletin board open to all.
Northern Liberties Neighbors Association (NLNA)
Friends of Orianna Hill Park
Chronology of the Political Subdivisions of the County of Philadelphia, 1683-1854
Information courtesy of ushistory.org
Incorporated District, Boroughs, and Townships in the County of Philadelphia, 1854 By Rudolph J. Walther - excerpted from the book at the ushistory.org website
Historic Photographs of Northern Liberties, PhillyHistory.org

 
Neighborhoods in Philadelphia
Municipalities in Philadelphia County prior to the Act of Consolidation, 1854
National Register of Historic Places in Philadelphia
Irish-American neighborhoods
Historic districts in Philadelphia
Populated places established in 1771
Historic districts on the National Register of Historic Places in Pennsylvania
Historical red-light districts in the United States